The soubashi was an Ottoman gubernatorial title used to describe different positions within Ottoman hierarchy, depending on the context. This title was given to Ottoman timar holders who generated more than 15,000 aspers per annum or to the assistants of the sanjak-bey. The term was also used for commander of the town or castle in Ottoman Empire, an ancient version of chief of police.

A surname found among Balkan families, Subaša or Subašić, is derived from the title.

References

Sources
 

Gubernatorial titles
Civil servants from the Ottoman Empire
Turkish words and phrases
Military ranks of the Ottoman Empire